Schefflera allocotantha is a flowering plant in the family Araliaceae. It is endemic to Bolivia.

References 

allocotantha
Flora of Bolivia